Peter Luczak and Alessandro Motti were the defending champions but decided not to participate.
Martin Kližan and Daniel Muñoz de la Nava won the title, defeating Íñigo Cervantes Huegun and Federico Delbonis 6–3, 1–6, [12–10] in the final.

Seeds

Draw

Draw

References
 Main Draw

2012 Doubles
Marrakech Doubles